Cnemaspis nuicamensis, also known as Nui Cam Hill rock gecko,  is a species of gecko endemic to southern Vietnam.

References

nuicamensis
Lizards of Asia
Reptiles described in 2007